The men's long jump event at the 1963 Summer Universiade was held at the Estádio Olímpico Monumental in Porto Alegre with the final on 8 September 1963.

Medalists

Results

Qualification

Final

References

Athletics at the 1963 Summer Universiade
1963